The  is a limited express service operated by East Japan Railway Company (JR East) between  in Tokyo and  via the Joban Line and Ueno-Tokyo Line since 14 March 2015. The services replaced the former Fresh Hitachi services operated on the Joban Line between Ueno and Iwaki. The Tokiwa train service name was also formerly used for semi-express services operated by Japanese National Railways (JNR) from June 1958 until March 1985.

Service outline
Tokiwa services are numbered from No. 51 to No. 92.

Northbound Tokiwa trains depart Ueno at mainly hourly intervals, from 7:30am to 22:30pm, and also 6:15pm, 7:15pm, 8:15pm, 10pm and 11pm (Tokiwa No. 91, the last service of the day). 

21 northbound trains and 22 southbound trains operate every weekday. For northbound services, 2 trains terminate at Tsuchiura, 15 at Katsuta, 3 at Takahagi and 1 at Iwaki. For southbound services, 16 trains terminate at Shinagawa, with 6 at Ueno.

25 northbound trains and 20 southbound trains operate every Saturday, Sunday or holiday. For northbound services, 2 trains terminate at Tsuchiura, 18 at Katsuta, 4 at Takahagi and 1 at Iwaki. For southbound services, 17 trains terminate at Shinagawa, with 3 at Ueno.

Ticketing 
A supplementary ticket has to be purchased to board the train, along with the basic fare ticket.

The Reserved Seat Ticket enables a specified seat to be reserved for the holder. The reserved status for the seat is signified by a green overhead lamp on top of the corresponding seat.

The Unreserved Seat Ticket enables the holder to be seated on any unreserved seat. A red overhead lamp signifies that the seat is unreserved; while a yellow overhead lamp signifies that the seat is reserved for the later part of the journey, implying that one has to give away their seat to the passenger who has reserved the seat, when they board the train later.

Rolling stock
 E657 series 10-car EMUs (March 2015 –)

Former rolling stock
 KiHa 55 series DMUs (June 1955 –)
 451 series EMUs (October 1962 – March 1985)

Formations
Tokiwa trains are formed as shown below, with car 1 at the Tokyo (Ueno/Shinagawa) end. All cars are no-smoking.

History

Three return services operated daily. Following electrification of the Joban Line, 451 series electric multiple unit (EMU) trains were introduced on some Tokiwa services from October 1962. Primarily used on Miyagino express services, these formations included buffet cars, although a buffet service was not provided on Tokiwa services.

A typical 11-car 451 series formation (without a buffet car) as used following the October 1978 timetable revision is shown below.

 Cars 2 and 9 were "Green" (first class) cars.

From 5 March 1966, Tokiwa services were upgraded from "semi express" to "express" status. From the start of the revised timetable on 14 March 1985, Tokiwa services were absorbed into Hitachi limited express services, and the name was discontinued.

Future plans 
Effective 18 March 2023, all services in both directions will make a scheduled stop at Kashiwa Station.

See also
 List of named passenger trains of Japan

References

External links

 

Named passenger trains of Japan
East Japan Railway Company
Railway services introduced in 1958
Railway services discontinued in 1985
Railway services introduced in 2015
1958 establishments in Japan
1985 disestablishments in Japan
2015 establishments in Japan

ja:ひたち (列車)